Paul D. Harold was a member of the Massachusetts Senate and the Registrar of Deeds for Norfolk County, Massachusetts. Previously he served on the Quincy, Massachusetts City Council. He died in 2002.

References

Massachusetts state senators
Massachusetts city council members
County officials in Massachusetts
People from Quincy, Massachusetts
2002 deaths
Year of birth missing